Vampire ang Daddy Ko is a Philippine television situational comedy series broadcast by GMA Network. The series was written and directed by Bibeth Orteza. It stars Vic Sotto and Oyo Boy Sotto. It premiered on March 9, 2013, and it concluded on June 12, 2016 with a total of 169 episodes. It was replaced by Hay, Bahay! in its timeslot.

Cast and characters

Lead cast
 Vic Sotto as Victor Ventura
 Oyo Boy Sotto as Vladimir Ventura

Supporting cast
 Glaiza de Castro as Vavavoom
 Pilita Corrales as Sonya Ventura
 Jackie Lou Blanco as younger Sonya Ventura
 Jinky Oda as Omma Chamba
 Ryzza Mae Dizon as Maria "Big" Saturay
 Jimmy Santos as Small Saturay
 Allan K. as Diva
 Bea Binene as Bebe Chubibo
 Anjo Yllana as Bibo Chubibo
 Derrick Monasterio as Derry Tiwarik
 Sef Cadayona as Stefano Bulaga / Stefani Ventura
 Jin Ri Park as Jin 
 Sam Pinto as Maria Chamba
 Jaclyn Jose as Elvyra
 Barbie Forteza as Girlie

Ratings
According to AGB Nielsen Philippines' Mega Manila household television ratings, the pilot episode of Vampire ang Daddy Ko earned a 23.7% rating. While the final episode scored an 18.5% rating.

Accolades

References

External links
 

2013 Philippine television series debuts
2016 Philippine television series endings
Filipino-language television shows
GMA Network original programming
Philippine comedy television series
Philippine television sitcoms
Television shows set in the Philippines
Vampires in television
Television series by M-Zet Productions